Cedar Fort is a town in Utah County, Utah, United States. It is part of the Provo–Orem Metropolitan Statistical Area. The population was 368 at the 2010 census.

Geography

Demographics
At the 2000 census, there were 341 people, 101 households, and 83 families in the town. The population density was 16.1 people per square mile (6.2/km). There were 110 housing units at an average density of 5.2 per square mile (2/km).  The racial makeup of the town was 95.89% White, 0.59% Native American, 0.29% Asian, 0.29% Pacific Islander, 0.29% from other races, and 2.64% from two or more races. Hispanic or Latino of any race were 0.88%.

Of the 101 households, 43.6% had children under 18, 76.2% were married couples living together, 4.0% had a female householder with no husband present, and 17.8% were non-families. 16.8% of households were one person, and 10.9% were one person aged 65 or older. The average household size was 3.38, and the average family size was 3.87.

The age distribution was 36.1% under the age of 18, 8.8% from 18 to 24, 24.0% from 25 to 44, 19.6% from 45 to 64, and 11.4% 65 or older. The median age was 29 years. For every 100 females, there were 101.8 males. For every 100 females aged 18 and over, there were 101.9 males.

The median household income was $44,773, and the median family income was $45,833. Males had a median income of $40,000 versus $25,500 for females. The per capita income for the town was $14,266. About 5.4% of families and 11.3% of the population were below the poverty line, including 18.5% of those under age 18 and 7.5% of those aged 65 or over.

Education
Cedar Fort is part of the Alpine School District. The only school in town is Cedar Valley Elementary. Older students attend schools in Eagle Mountain and Saratoga Springs.

See also

 List of cities and towns in Utah
 Camp Floyd

References

External links

 

 
Towns in Utah
Provo–Orem metropolitan area
Populated places established in 1852
1852 establishments in Utah Territory
Towns in Utah County, Utah